Winter melon punch also called winter melon tea in East Asia, is a sweetened fruit drink with a very distinctive taste. It can be found at many stores and street vendors in Taiwan. Because of its inexpensive preparation process, this regional folk beverage has become a favorite recipe for street sellers as well as people at home. In China, winter melon tea is believed to help people deal with hot temperatures and help with weight loss. Because of this, it is commonly referred to as "slim tea".

Ingredients 
The winter melon is peeled, sliced, and its seeds are removed. The melon is cut, the slices are stirred and cooked in boiling water with brown sugar or caramel for several hours. This mixture is filtered by gauze or sieve, ridding it of the dregs and impurities. Once clean, the brown liquid cools completely, it is then refrigerated, canned, and sold as concentrated winter melon punch. It can also be dehydrated and cut into solid cubes, and can be sold as winter melon punch cubes.

A sugar-free version of the winter melon punch is made for people with kidney issues and diabetes. In this variation, the cooking process is the same, except that no sugar is used in the process.

Some soak the winter melon slices in lime or calcium hydroxide to preserve the melon's original flavor by hardening the flesh before boiling them with sugar, caramel, and water.

Variations 
Different flavors of winter melon punch appear throughout Taiwan. People may add lemon juice, oolong tea, or many other drinks to it, according to their preferences, to make mixed drinks or even cocktails. To transfer this popular beverage into a snack food, many street vendors add tapioca balls, nata de coco, or tangyuan to winter melon punch and sell it in bowls.

See also
 List of juices

External links

References

Taiwanese cuisine
Fruit juice
Melons